Fertőszéplak is a village in Győr-Moson-Sopron county, Hungary.

Fertődszéplak is one of the Hungarian villages on the international Lake Neusiedl Bike Trail. Other Hungarian places on the course are Fertőd, Hegykő, Fertőhomok, Hidegség, Fertőboz, Balf und Fertőrákos.

The important Hungarian noble family Széchenyi originated from Fertöszéplak and lived here until they moved to Nagycenk in the 18th century.

The baroque Allsaints church was built in 1726 under Count György Széchenyi. Besides the church is a small calvary.

The Széchenyi castle is situated opposite the church.

The Village Museum: On the Széplaki Road you can find several examples of baroque farmhouses. Five of them contain the village museum. These nicely restorated buildings exhibit examples of history and work and life of the common people around the Lake Neusiedl. Different examples of fully furnished kitchens, bed- and livingrooms show the development of the lifestyle from 1850 to 1950. Also on display are examples of craftmenship like weaving, wickerwork and fishing. In the  barns and sheds, some of them with thatched roofs, examples of the technical development in farming are shown.

Gallery

Source:
 Museumsguide of Sopron, (www.tourinform.sopron.hu)
 Allgemeines Bildungszentrum Porpáczy Aladár, 9431 Fertöd, Joseph Haydn str. 2

External links 

Official website (jet only) in Hungarian
 Street map 

Populated places in Győr-Moson-Sopron County